Edwin Gagiano (born June 1, 1989) is a South African-born actor, screenwriter, producer, singer/songwriter and model based in Los Angeles, California. He is regarded as one of South Africa’s highest-earning actors by The New Age and has won several awards for his achievements, including Best Actor Award for his role as Alf Bueller in the show Back to the 80s.

Early life 

Gagiano was born in Kimberley, Northern Cape, and relocated to Los Angeles in 2015. His father, Albertus Johannes, is a math lecturer and a war veteran who served his country during the South African Border War in the 1980s. His mother, Maryna Elizabeth, is a retired banker and interior designer. Gagiano is of Italian, British and Welsh ancestry. Gagiano attended Technical High School (HTS Kimberley) and began his career at sixteen as a stage actor when he landed one of the leading roles as Alf Bueller in the Northern Cape Theatre musical Back to the 80s. In 2014, he was cast by the Peoples Theatre as Disney’s Prince Charming in Cinderella.

Career

Acting 

Gagiano made his television debut as the lead in SABC 2’s primetime television series Snake Park (2014), portraying Zak Verwey. The show got picked up for a second season in 2015 due to its high viewership, exceeding 2 million viewers per episode. Gagiano went on to star and co-star in nine feature films and three television series. He was included in the closing cast of the soap opera Villa Rosa in 2015, starring as Marcel Geldenhuys. Gagiano starred in several other feature films, including Seun: 81457397BG (2014), and Last Broken Darkness (2016). He had a bit part in the movie Chappie (2015).

Commercials 

In 2015, Gagiano was cast as the lead in South Africa’s national Toyota ad campaign to advertise the new Toyota Aygo. This campaign covered television, cinema, public locations and internet usage, with more than 200,000 views on YouTube.

Singing and songwriting 

In 2010, Gagiano released an EP album with 6 songs. His single "Mommy" was repeatedly played on PUK FM 93.6, and "3 Reasons Why" played on Highveld Stereo. Gagiano wrote the Afrikaans single "Stille Praatwerk", which he performed on the kykNET hit television series Sterlopers, as Andre Groenewald.

Filmography

Film roles

Television roles

Theatre roles

Commercials

Awards, honors and achievements 

Best Actor Award – Gagiano received the Best Actor Award for his role as Alf Bueller in Back to the 80’s.
Honors in Drama and Arts – In 2007, Gagiano was awarded the Blazer of Honor in Drama and Arts by HTS Kimberley.
Top Male Actor in Villa Rosa Star Hunt competition – Gagiano was the only male actor to advance to the Top 10 of this nationwide competition out of thousands of actors. Villa Rosa Star Hunt was televised on KykNET television.

Influences 
Gagiano's acting influences are Jack Nicholson, Kevin Spacey, Leonardo DiCaprio, Al Pacino and Matt Damon. His biggest director influence is Steven Spielberg.

References

External links 
 
 

1989 births
Living people
South African male actors